Christopher Jason Witten (born May 6, 1982) is an American former professional football player who was a tight end for 17 seasons, primarily for the Dallas Cowboys of the National Football League (NFL). He currently is the head coach of the Liberty Christian School. He played college football for the University of Tennessee, and was drafted by the Cowboys in the third round of the 2003 NFL Draft. Witten ranks second in all-time career receptions and receiving yards by an NFL tight end, trailing only Tony Gonzalez.  He is widely regarded as one of the greatest tight ends of all time.

Initially retiring in 2018, he became a color analyst for ESPN's Monday Night Football. After working as an ESPN color analyst for the 2018 season, Witten returned to the NFL for the 2019 season, reuniting with the Cowboys. Witten then joined the Las Vegas Raiders for the 2020 season. Witten afterward retired again but signed a one-day contract to retire as a member of the Cowboys.

Early life
Witten has one cousin, Triston Witten, two older brothers, Ryan and Shawn who were raised in Washington D.C., but attended Elizabethton High School in Elizabethton, Tennessee. Witten's father, a 6'8", 300 lb. mailman, became addicted to alcohol and drugs when Witten was 6 and became abusive toward Witten's mother, Kim, and Witten's older brothers. When Witten was 11, he moved to Elizabethton to live with his grandparents. His grandfather, Dave Rider, was the coach of the football team where Witten was a two-way player, playing linebacker and tight end.

Witten became a three-year starter playing both linebacker and tight end, while helping his team reach the state semi-finals three times. As a senior linebacker, he finished the season with 163 tackles (registering a career school record 450), nine sacks, two interceptions, five forced fumbles, three fumble recoveries, and two blocked kicks. That year, he received several accolades: All-American, All-State (also as a junior), USA Today Player of the Year for Tennessee, East Tennessee Player of the Year, Region Defensive Player of the Year and runner-up for the Mr. Football award. He had 26 receptions and 14 touchdowns on offense. He also played basketball, where he averaged 15 points and 12 rebounds per game.

College career

2000 season

In 2000, Witten accepted a scholarship to the University of Tennessee, with the promise from head coach Phillip Fulmer that he would be played at defensive end. Witten began his first year playing special teams and also saw time as a second-string defensive end.

After injuries impacted the depth at the tight end position, he was moved to the offensive side midway through the season. Although Witten did not agree with the change and even considered transferring, he eventually came around and was used primarily as a blocker while he learned the position. He also started in his first two games. As a freshman, he appeared in 12 games and recorded one reception on the season, which went for 11 yards in a 70–3 victory over Louisiana–Monroe.

2001 season

Witten appeared in all 13 games as a sophomore, catching 28 passes for 293 yards and two touchdowns. He scored his first collegiate touchdown in a 35–24 victory over Alabama in their annual rivalry game. Witten had 125 receiving yards and a touchdown in Tennessee's Citrus Bowl victory over Michigan. Witten's performance in the 45–17 victory marked the third most receiving yards in a bowl game in Tennessee history.

2002 season

As a junior, he had a breakout year, setting school records for a tight end in receptions (39) and receiving yards (493) with five touchdowns, including one of the most memorable receptions in school history, a game-winning touchdown in the sixth overtime against Arkansas. He received All-SEC (SEC) and Academic All-SEC honors after leading the conference's tight ends in receptions and receiving yards. He was a semifinalist for the John Mackey Tight End Award.

Even though he decided to enter the NFL Draft after his junior season and had played the position in only 20 games, Witten left ranked third all-time among the school's tight ends with 68 career receptions and fourth all-time with 797 receiving yards.

Legacy
Following the 2017 college football season, Witten's name was placed on a college football award. The Jason Witten Collegiate Man of the Year award honors a player who shows strong leadership qualities on and off the field.

Professional career

Dallas Cowboys

2003 season

Witten was selected by the Dallas Cowboys in the third round with the 69th overall pick in the 2003 NFL Draft. He was the fifth tight end selected that year. Although the Cowboys had a first-round grade on him, when their turn came in the first and second rounds, they selected cornerback Terrence Newman and Al Johnson based on team needs. Undrafted free agent Tony Romo was another rookie who also arrived in Dallas in 2003 and would go on to become Witten's teammate throughout their careers, as well as his roommate during future team training camps and travel games.

Entering the league as a 20-year-old rookie, one of the youngest players in the NFL, Witten started seven of the 15 games he played in. On September 7, he made his NFL debut in a 27–13 loss to the Atlanta Falcons, where he had one reception for 13 yards. He broke his jaw against the Arizona Cardinals, after being hit by Ronald McKinnon and Ray Thompson, which required surgery to have three plates inserted to help the healing. He only missed one game and continued to play through the injury. Head coach Bill Parcells complimented Witten on his toughness. Witten was named to the NFL All-Rookie Team for the 2003 season.

Witten finished his rookie year with 35 receptions for 347 receiving yards and a receiving touchdown. He made his playoff debut in the Wild Card Round against the Carolina Panthers. He had four receptions for 30 yards in the 29–10 loss.

2004 season

Witten had a breakout season in 2004, finishing with 87 receptions for 980 receiving yards and six receiving touchdowns. His 87 receptions led the NFC and were the 11th most in NFL history by a tight end and a Cowboys team record for the position. In Week 7, against the Green Bay Packers, he had eight receptions for 112 receiving yards and one touchdown in the 41–20 loss. On November 15, against the Philadelphia Eagles, he had nine receptions for 133 yards and two touchdowns in Week 10. He was selected to his first Pro Bowl.

2005 season

Witten finished sixth in the NFL among tight ends with 66 receptions and became the first Cowboys tight end to have at least 65 receptions in consecutive seasons. He had 66 receptions for 757 receiving yards and six touchdown receptions for the 9–7 Cowboys in 2005. As a result of his successful season, he was named to his second Pro Bowl.

2006 season

At the end of the 2006 season, Witten became just the tenth tight end in NFL history to post three consecutive seasons with at least 60 receptions. He registered 64 receptions for 754 yards and one touchdown, while being named to his third Pro Bowl in as many seasons.

On July 22, Witten signed a six-year, $29 million contract extension through 2012. The deal contained $12 million guaranteed, including a $6 million signing bonus and a $6 million option bonus in the second year.

2007 season

Witten had a career year in 2007, breaking his own single-season Cowboys tight end record for receptions with 96 and becoming the first franchise tight end to reach 1,000 receiving yards in a season. He became the third tight end in NFL history with 96 or more catches. He started the season off strong with six receptions for 116 receiving yards and a touchdown in a 45–35 victory over the New York Giants in Week 1.  In the Week 9 game on November 4, while playing on the road against the Philadelphia Eagles, he made a 53-yard reception after losing his helmet. On December 9 against the Detroit Lions in Week 14, Witten's 15 receptions tied an NFL record held by Hall of Famer Kellen Winslow Sr., for most receptions in a game by a tight end in NFL history. In the following game against the Eagles in Week 15, Witten became the first Dallas tight end ever to gain over 1,000 receiving yards in a season. Witten was also one of the NFL-record 13 Cowboys players selected to the Pro Bowl. He was named as a First-team All-Pro for the 2007 season. Witten was nominated for the 2007 Walter Payton NFL Man of the Year Award, which was won by Jason Taylor.

The Cowboys made the playoffs with a 13–3 record. In the Divisional Round against the New York Giants, he had seven receptions for 81 yards in the 21–17 loss.

2008 season

In Week 2, Witten recorded seven receptions for 110 receiving yards in the 41–37 victory over the  Philadelphia Eagles. Witten made his 400th NFL reception in the Cowboys' Thanksgiving Day game against the Seattle Seahawks in Week 13 as part of a nine-reception, 115-yard, one-touchdown performance. On December 28, against the Eagles in Week 17, he completed a 42-yard pass to Terrell Owens for the first pass of his NFL career. Witten posted 81 receptions, which ranked 13th in the NFL for 2008, 952 yards, four touchdowns, and was named a starter for the 2008 Pro Bowl.

2009 season

Witten recorded his first 100-yard game of the 2009 season in Week 12 against the Oakland Raiders. In the 24–7 victory, he had five receptions for 107 receiving yards. In the following game, against the New York Giants, he had 14 receptions for 156 receiving yards in the 31–24 loss. In Week 16, against the Washington Redskins, he had six receptions for 117 receiving yards in the 17–0 victory. Overall, Witten recorded another Pro Bowl season, making 94 receptions for 1,030 yards and two touchdowns while starting all 16 games. He was given the NFL Iron Man Award.

The Cowboys finished with a 11–5 record and made the playoffs. In the Wild Card Round against the Philadelphia Eagles, he had four receptions for 27 receiving yards in the 34–14 victory. In the Divisional Round against the Minnesota Vikings, he had ten receptions for 98 receiving yards in the 34–3 loss.

2010 season

Witten banged his head on the turf after making a catch in a Week 2 loss against the Chicago Bears. He was forced to miss the rest of the game with a concussion.

In a Week 15 game against the Washington Redskins, Witten became the fastest tight end to make 600 receptions (125 games). He accomplished this with a 10-catch, 140-yard, one-touchdown day at home. He received his seventh consecutive Pro Bowl selection when he was named as the starting tight end for the NFC.

At the end of the season, Witten was named tight end of the Year by the NFL Alumni Association.

Overall, Witten finished the 2010 season with 94 receptions for 1,002 yards and nine touchdowns. He was named as a First-team All-Pro for the second time in his career. He was ranked No. 36 by his fellow players on the NFL Top 100 Players of 2011.

2011 season

Witten started the 2011 season with consecutive 100-yard receiving games in a loss to the New York Jets and a victory over San Francisco 49ers. On November 13, in Week 10 against the Buffalo Bills, Witten surpassed Ozzie Newsome to become the tight end with the third most receptions in NFL history with 663. Witten finished the season with 79 receptions for 942 receiving yards and five touchdowns playing in all 16 games. He was ranked 75th by his fellow players on the NFL Top 100 Players of 2012.

2012 season

On August 13, 2012, Witten suffered a lacerated spleen in the preseason opener against the Oakland Raiders and missed the rest of the preseason. There was talk that the seriousness of the injury could keep him out of action for a considerable time.

On September 5, Witten battled back and was able to play in the season opener, catching two passes for 10 yards in a 24–17 victory over the New York Giants. Witten's availability for the game was in question due to the spleen injury he suffered during the preseason, but he was active for the game after being medically cleared to play.

During Week 2 against the Seattle Seahawks, Witten caught four passes for 58 yards. He finished the game with 702 career receptions to become just the second player in franchise history to reach 700 catches and the third tight end in NFL history to do so. Witten became the fastest tight end to reach 700 catches, reaching the milestone in 145 games. Witten  became the youngest wide receiver/tight end to reach 700 catches at 30 years and 133 days. This record was later broken in Week 3 by Cardinals' wide receiver Larry Fitzgerald who totaled 707 career catches with 29 years, 23 days. His 58-yard performance gave him 7,977 receiving yards for his career passing former Cowboy Jackie Smith for fourth all-time in receiving yards among tight ends.

After Week 3, Witten passed Ozzie Newsome for third place all-time in receiving yards among tight ends. In Week 8, a 29–24 loss to the New York Giants, Witten caught a career-high 18 passes for a career-high 167 yards. This is also a record for receptions by a tight end; the previous record of 15 receptions was set by Kellen Winslow in 1984.

On November 4, in Week 9 against the Atlanta Falcons, Witten set the Cowboys' all-time receptions record of 754, surpassing Michael Irvin's previous record of 750.

On December 23, in Week 16 against the New Orleans Saints, Witten set the NFL single-season record for receptions by a tight end (103), breaking the previous record of 102 receptions, which had been set by Tony Gonzalez in 2004. He extended the record to 110 in the season finale.

On December 26, Witten was selected to his eighth Pro Bowl. For the second time in his career, Witten was nominated for the Walter Payton Man of the Year Award, this time winning the award and the $25,000 donation to his charity. Overall, he finished the 2012 season with 110 receptions for 1,039 yards and three touchdowns. His 110 receptions were the second-most in franchise history behind Michael Irvin (111 in 1995) and ranked fifth in the NFL for the season. He was ranked 41st  among his peers on the NFL Top 100 Players of 2013.

2013 season

In the regular season opener against the New York Giants, Witten had two receiving touchdowns in the 36–31 victory. In Week 2 against the Kansas City Chiefs, Witten surpassed Shannon Sharpe with the second most receptions as a tight end in NFL history. His three catches during the game brought his career total to 817. In Week 5, against the Denver Broncos, he had seven receptions for 121 receiving yards and one touchdown in the 51–48 shootout loss. In Week 12, in the second divisional game against the Giants, he added two more receiving touchdowns in the 24–21 victory. In the season finale against the Philadelphia Eagles, he had 12 receptions for 135 yards in the 24–22 loss. He finished the 2013 season with starts in all 16 games. He recorded 73 receptions for 851 yards and eight touchdowns. He was named to the Pro Bowl for the ninth time in his career. He was ranked 98th by his fellow players on the NFL Top 100 Players of 2014.

2014 season 

In a Week 5 game against the Houston Texans on October 5, Witten became only the third tight end with 10,000 career receiving yards, joining Shannon Sharpe and Tony Gonzalez.

Witten became the all-time leader for consecutive starts by a tight end after he started against the Seattle Seahawks in Week 6. In that same game, he also became the second tight end in NFL history to reach 900 receptions.

In Week 7, Witten had 27 yards against the New York Giants to move his career receiving yards to 10,065 to pass Shannon Sharpe (10,060) for the second-most receiving yards by an NFL tight end. In Week 16, Witten sprained his knee against the Indianapolis Colts but was still able to play in the season finale against the Washington Redskins.

That season, the Cowboys emphasized the running game and although his receiving production declined, his blocking was noticed while helping DeMarco Murray lead the NFL in rushing. Witten finished with 60 receptions for 654 yards and five touchdowns. He was named to his tenth career Pro Bowl for his 2014 season. He was ranked 93rd by his peers on the NFL Top 100 Players of 2015.

2015 season

In the regular season opener against the New York Giants, Witten had eight receptions for 60 receiving yards and two receiving touchdowns in the 27–26 victory. In Week 2 against the Philadelphia Eagles, Witten suffered a right knee injury and two sprained ankles but was able to only miss a play and a half. On November 22, against the Miami Dolphins he became the franchise's iron man, playing his 196th consecutive game and surpassing Bob Lilly. Two weeks later, in a Monday Night Football game against the Washington Redskins, Witten became the 12th player and second tight end in NFL history to reach 1,000 receptions. The only other tight end with 1,000 or more catches is Tony Gonzalez. On December 27, in Week 16 against the Buffalo Bills, he set the Cowboys record with his 118th consecutive game with a reception, passing Michael Irvin.

During the 2015 season, Witten was asked to be more involved in the blocking than usual, because of the team playing with four different starting quarterbacks with varying degrees of knowledge of the offense. He started all 16 games and led the Cowboys with 77 receptions for 713 yards and three touchdowns.

2016 season

Against the Philadelphia Eagles in Week 8, Witten caught the game-winning touchdown in overtime, making him the first player in franchise history to score in 14 seasons. In Week 9, against the Cleveland Browns, he had eight receptions for 134 receiving yards and one touchdown in the 35–10 victory. He finished the season 16 receiving yards shy of Michael Irvin's all-time franchise record. Overall, Witten started all 16 games and finished the regular season with 69 receptions for 673 receiving yards and three touchdowns. He caught his first career post-season touchdown from Dak Prescott in the Cowboys' 34–31 Divisional Round loss to the Green Bay Packers.

2017 season

On March 28, 2017, Witten signed a four-year contract extension with the Cowboys through the 2021 season.

During a Week 1 19–3 victory against the New York Giants on Sunday Night Football, Witten recorded the Cowboys' lone touchdown. In addition, he passed Michael Irvin for most career receiving yards in franchise history and also became the third player in NFL history to have at least 150 catches against one team, joining Jerry Rice and Larry Fitzgerald. On September 17, in Week 2 against the Denver Broncos, Witten had ten receptions for 97 yards and a touchdown in the 42–17 defeat. He started all 16 games and finished the season with 63 receptions for 560 yards and five touchdowns, on his way to his 11th Pro Bowl, which tied a Cowboys record with Bob Lilly.

Initial retirement

On April 26, 2018, reports surfaced that Witten was going to retire and accept a position as the lead analyst for ESPN's Monday Night Football telecasts. A week later, Witten officially announced his retirement and confirmed he would be joining Monday Night Football for the 2018 season.

Dallas Cowboys (second stint)

On February 28, 2019, ESPN announced that Witten will return to the Cowboys on a one-year, $4.5 million deal, and leave his Monday Night Football position at the company. In his return to the gridiron, Witten had three receptions for 15 yards and a receiving touchdown in the 35–17 victory over the New York Giants in the Cowboys' 2019 regular season opener. Overall, in the 2019 season, Witten started all 16 games and recorded 63 receptions for 529 receiving yards and four receiving touchdowns.

Las Vegas Raiders

On March 25, 2020, Witten signed a one-year contract with the Las Vegas Raiders. In Week 4, against the Buffalo Bills, he had his first touchdown as a Raider on a three-yard reception from quarterback Derek Carr. He was fined  by the NFL on October 5, 2020, for attending a maskless charity event hosted by teammate Darren Waller during the COVID-19 pandemic in violation of the NFL's COVID-19 protocols for the 2020 season. In the 2020 season, he started seven games and recorded 13 receptions for 69 receiving yards and two receiving touchdowns.

On January 27, 2021, Witten once again announced his retirement from the NFL and stated his intention to sign a one-day contract to retire as a member of the Cowboys.

NFL career statistics

Regular season

Postseason

NFL records and achievements
 Most career NFL games played by a tight end: 271
 Most receptions in a single game by a tight end: 18 (October 28, 2012)
 2012 Walter Payton NFL Man of the Year Award winner
 4th in receptions in NFL history: 1,228 (as of 2021)
 Most consecutive games played by a tight end: 235 (243 including playoffs)
 Most consecutive games started by a tight end: 179 (186 including playoffs)
 Fastest tight end to make 600 receptions (125 games)

Cowboys franchise records
 Most career receptions: 1,215
 Most career receiving yards: 12,977
 Most receptions in a single game: 18 (October 28, 2012, against the New York Giants)
 Most games played: 255
 Most consecutive games started: 179
 First tight end to reach 1,000 receiving yards in a season
 First tight end to have at least 65 receptions in consecutive seasons
 First player in franchise history to score in 16 seasons

Coaching career
On February 1, 2022, Witten was named the head coach of the Liberty Christian School.

Personal life
Witten resides in Westlake, Texas, located in the Dallas – Fort Worth Metroplex, with his wife Michelle, an emergency room nurse at Dallas's Parkland Memorial Hospital, and their four children, C.J., Cooper, Landry, and Hadley Grace.
Witten is a Christian, and appears in a video on I Am Second in which he talks about his faith.

Witten wrote an opinion piece for ESPN, titled "How Twitter has become NFL locker room poison" in which he detailed the potential negative impact social media can have, particularly on younger players, from his personal experiences.

In 2021 and just days after his retirement from the NFL, Witten spurned the overtures of several NFL and college teams to coach and was named the head football coach at Liberty Christian School in Argyle, Texas.

References

External links

 
 
 Tennessee Volunteers bio
 

1982 births
Living people
10,000 receiving yards club
American Christians
American football tight ends
Dallas Cowboys players
Ed Block Courage Award recipients
Las Vegas Raiders players
National Conference Pro Bowl players
National Football League announcers
People from Coppell, Texas
People from Elizabethton, Tennessee
Players of American football from Dallas
Players of American football from Tennessee
Players of American football from Washington, D.C.
Tennessee Volunteers football players
Unconferenced Pro Bowl players